National Palaces Painting Museum (Turkish: Milli Saraylar Resim Müzesi) is an art museum in Istanbul, Turkey, opened at the Crown Prince Residence of Dolmabahçe Palace in 2014. The museum exhibits approximately 200 pieces from the palace's collection of paintings by both Turkish and international artists of the 19th century. The museum is funded by the TBMM.

History
The historical building used to house the Istanbul Art and Sculpture Museum which was founded within the order of Turkey's first president Mustafa Kemal Atatürk in 1937 and served as part of Mimar Sinan Fine Arts University. After the renovation between 2010 and 2014, it was transformed into a new museum to house pieces of 19th and early-20th century art, which were mainly gathered from the palaces of Ottoman dynasty.

Collection

The museum has more than 200 paintings displayed in 11 sections. Some of the displayed collections are listed below.

Paintings by Turkish Artists (1870-1930) 
This collection consists of works by Ottoman/Turkish artists such as Şeker Ahmed Pasha, Osman Hamdi Bey, Hüseyin Zekai Pasha and Hodja Ali Rıza; which make up the second, third and fourth generation of the Turkish painting in Western sense.

Paintings by Court Painters
Works by artists such as Stanislaw Chlebowski and Fausto Zonaro, which respectively served to Abdulaziz and Abdülhamid II as their court painters.

Paintings Bought from Goupil Gallery for the Palace
Two sections consist of paintings that were bought from the Goupil Gallery in Paris during the reign of Abdulaziz. The paintings that were bought in this era reflect the taste of Sultan Abdulaziz and his assistant Şeker Ahmed Pasha. A Western style collection of paintings was brought together for the first time at the Dolmabahçe Palace during the reign of Sultan Abdulaziz.

Paintings by Ivan Aivazovsky
The Ceremony Hall, which is the most magnificent room of the structure with its stucco-lined walls and composite-headed plasters, is allocated to the Russian artist Aivazovsky.

Paintings by Abdülmecid II
The hall that exhibits this collection originally used to be the library of Abdülmecid II himself, who was born to become the last crown prince and caliph of the Ottoman dynasty. Interested in almost all branches of art, but particularly calligraphy and music, he remained a celebrated artist of Turkish painting.

Orientalist Paintings
The museum has a rich collection of works by 19th century Orientalist painters.

References

See also
İstanbul State Art and Sculpture Museum
Pera Museum
History of Modern Turkish painting
List of art museums
Villa painting Dubai 

Art museums and galleries in Istanbul
Turkish art
Art museums established in 2014
2014 establishments in Turkey